"Old Shep" is a song composed by Red Foley, with lyrics by Arthur Willis, published in 1935, about a dog Foley owned as a child. In reality, the dog, poisoned by a neighbor, was a German Shepherd called "Hoover." Foley first recorded the song on December 9, 1935, for American Record Corporation (ARC) in Chicago, then re-recorded it on March 4, 1941, his first session for Decca Record Company, and again for them on July 31, 1946. He recorded for Decca the rest of his life, 1941 to 1968.

Other versions 
The song, later recorded by many artists including Hank Snow and Elvis Presley, became a country classic. 
Tex Morton 1941, Hank Williams 1942, Elvis Presley 1956, Hank Snow 1959, Walter Brennan 1960, Dave Dudley 1965, Johnny Cash 1975, Everly Brothers & Garrison Keillor 1988, Pat Boone 1994, Burton Cummings (as Elvis) 1994, Alabama 2006.

A version of the song by Clinton Ford appeared in the UK Singles Chart in October 1959, spending one week at number 27.

Colombian performer Marco recorded a Spanish language version in 1986.

Elvis Presley connection 
On October 3, 1945, Elvis Presley sang "Old Shep" at age ten for his first public performance, a singing contest at the Mississippi-Alabama Fair and Dairy Show. Dressed as a cowboy, he stood on a chair to reach the microphone. He came in fifth place, winning $5 and a free ticket to the fair rides. At sixteen years of age, in 1951, he again performed it for a talent show at L. C. Humes High School, where he was a student, winning an encore for his performance.  Elvis' cover version was released in 1956.

Cultural references 
Led Zeppelin's 1970 song "Bron-Y-Aur Stomp", which is about Robert Plant's dog, mentions "Old Shep" in the line "When you're old and your eyes are dim / Ain't no Old Shep gonna happen again."

In the British TV sitcom Only Fools and Horses, "Old Shep" is Del Boy's favourite song about a dog. In the 1982 Christmas special "Diamonds Are for Heather," Del gets a local mariachi band to sing "Old Shep." At the end of the episode, after being dumped by Heather, he pays some Christmas carol singers to sing the song to cheer himself up. In a later episode, "Modern Men," Del has "Old Shep" as the "on hold" music on his mobile phone, plus it plays on the radio in Sid's café in "The Long Legs of the Law." The song was also heard in the third episode of the prequel series Rock & Chips, "The Frog and the Pussycat", when Del was listening to the song in a bar.

In the 1987 episode "Oh, Brother" of American sitcom Family Ties, it is revealed that Steven Keaton's older brother, for amusement, would hold down Steven and make him listen to "Old Shep" when both were children, knowing that the song would always make Steven start crying. (Series creator Gary David Goldberg later revealed that this was based on his own childhood, when his real-life older brother would do this to him.) At the end of the episode, Steven and his son, Alex P. Keaton, listen to the song, and both start crying.

References

1935 songs
1936 singles
Elvis Presley songs
Hank Snow songs
Red Foley songs
Songs about death
Songs about dogs
Walter Brennan songs